Binodoxys is a genus of parasitoid wasp of the subfamily Aphidiinae which are noted parasitoids of aphids. Its species generally prey on aphids which live on herbaceous plants.

Species 
The following species are accepted within Binodoxys:

 Binodoxys acalephae (Marshall, 1896)
 Binodoxys achalensis Stary, 2004
 Binodoxys acyrthosiphonis (Stary, 1983)
 Binodoxys angelicae (Haliday, 1833)
 Binodoxys angelicae sikkimensis (Raychaudhuri, Samanta, Pramanik, Tamili & Sarkar, 1990)
 Binodoxys angolensis (Stary & Harten, 1977)
 Binodoxys basicurvus (Shuja-Uddin, 1973)
 Binodoxys basituber (Stary & Remaudiere, 1982)
 Binodoxys benoiti (Mackauer, 1959)
 Binodoxys brevicornis (Haliday, 1833)
 Binodoxys brunnescens (Stary & Schlinger, 1967)
 Binodoxys carinatus (Stary & Schlinger, 1967)
 Binodoxys carolinensis (Smith, 1944)
 Binodoxys centaureae (Haliday, 1833)
 Binodoxys ceratovacunae (Agarwala, Saha & Mahapatra, 1987)
 Binodoxys chilensis (Stary, 1995)
 Binodoxys clydesmithi Pike & Stary, 1996
 Binodoxys communis (Gahan, 1926)
 Binodoxys conei Pike & Stary, 1995
 Binodoxys coruscanigrans (Gahan, 1911)
 Binodoxys crudelis (Rondani, 1848)
 Binodoxys cupressicola (Gahan, 1911)
 Binodoxys equatus (Samanta, Tamili & Raychaudhuri, 1985)
 Binodoxys eutrichosiphi (Stary, 1975)
 Binodoxys genistae (Mackauer, 1960)
 Binodoxys gossypiaphis Chou & Xiang, 1982
 Binodoxys grafi Pike & Stary, 1996
 Binodoxys greenideae (Stary & Harten, 1983)
 Binodoxys harinhalai Stary, 2005
 Binodoxys heraclei (Haliday, 1833)
 Binodoxys hirsutus (Wang & Dong, 1993)
 Binodoxys hirticaudatus (Stary, 1983)
 Binodoxys hyperomyzi (Stary, 1983)
 Binodoxys impatientini (Stary & Remaudiere, 1983)
 Binodoxys indicus (Subba Rao & Sharma, 1958)
 Binodoxys jaii (Bhagat, 1982)
 Binodoxys joshimathensis (Das & Chakrabarti, 1989)
 Binodoxys kashmirensis Takada & Rishi, 1980
 Binodoxys kelloggensis Pike, Stary & Brewer, 2007
 Binodoxys kumaonensis (Stary & Raychaudhuri, 1982)
 Binodoxys letifer (Haliday, 1833)
 Binodoxys longispinus (Shuja-Uddin, 1983)
 Binodoxys mackaueri (Das & Chakrabarti, 1989)
 Binodoxys madagascariensis Stary, 2005
 Binodoxys manipurensis (Paonam & Singh, 1986)
 Binodoxys micromyzellae (Stary, 1985)
 Binodoxys mongolicus Takada, 1979
 Binodoxys nearctaphidis Mackauer, 1965
 Binodoxys nungbaensis (Paonam & Singh, 1986)
 Binodoxys odinae Paik, 1976
 Binodoxys oregmae (Agarwala, Saha & Mahapatra, 1987)
 Binodoxys palmerae (Smith, 1944)
 Binodoxys pterastheniae (Stary & Remaudiere, 1977)
 Binodoxys rhagii (Ashmead, 1889)
 Binodoxys rubicola (Shuja-Uddin, 1973)
 Binodoxys shillongensis (Stary, 1978)
 Binodoxys silvaticus (Stary, 1972)
 Binodoxys silvicola (Stary, 1972)
 Binodoxys similis (Mackauer, 1959)
 Binodoxys sinensis Mackauer, 1962
 Binodoxys solitarius (Stary, 1983)
 Binodoxys spiraea (Dong & Wang, 1993)
 Binodoxys staryi Davidian, 2007
 Binodoxys struma (Gahan, 1926)
 Binodoxys takecallis (Das & Chakrabarti, 1989)
 Binodoxys tamaliae (Stary & Remaudiere, 1983)
 Binodoxys tobiasi (Davidian, 2004)
 Binodoxys tomentosae (Das & Chakrabarti, 1990)
 Binodoxys toxopterae (Takada, 1966)
 Binodoxys trichosiphae (Samanta & Raychaudhuri, 1990)
 Binodoxys tucumanus (Tobias, 1987)

References 

Braconidae
Insects described in 1960
Hymenoptera genera